2000 (two thousand) is a natural number following 1999 and preceding 2001.

It is:
the highest number expressible using only two unmodified characters in Roman numerals (MM)
an Achilles number
smallest four digit eban number

Selected numbers in the range 2001–2999

2001 to 2099
 2001 – sphenic number
 2002 – palindromic number
 2003 – Sophie Germain prime and the smallest prime number in the 2000s
 2004 – Area of the 24th crystagon
 2005 – A vertically symmetric number
 2006 – number of subsets of {1,2,3,4,5,6,7,8,9,10,11} with relatively prime elements
 2007 – 22007 + 20072 is prime
 2008 – number of 4 X 4 matrices with nonnegative integer entries and row and column sums equal to 3
 2009 = 74 − 73 − 72
 2010 – number of compositions of 12 into relatively prime parts
 2011 – sexy prime with 2017, sum of eleven consecutive primes: 2011 = 157 + 163 + 167 + 173 + 179 + 181 + 191 + 193 + 197 + 199 + 211
 2012 – The number 8 × 102012 − 1 is a prime number
 2013 – number of widely totally strongly normal compositions of 17
 2014 – 5 × 22014 - 1 is prime
 2015 – Lucas–Carmichael number
 2016 – triangular number, number of 5-cubes in a 9-cube, Erdős–Nicolas number, 211-25.
 2017 – Mertens function zero, sexy prime with 2011
 2018 – Number of partitions of 60 into prime parts
 2019 – smallest number that can be represented as the sum of 3 prime squares 6 different ways:  2019 = 72 + 112 + 432 = 72 + 172 + 412 = 132 + 132 + 412 = 112 + 232 + 372 = 172 + 192 + 372 = 232 + 232 + 312.
 2020 – sum of the totient function for the first 81 integers
 2021 = 43 * 47, consecutive prime numbers, next is 2491
 2022 – non-isomorphic colorings of a toroidal 3 × 3 grid using exactly three colors under translational symmetry, beginning of a run of 4 consecutive Niven numbers
 2023 = 7 * 17 * 17 – multiple of 7 with digit sum equal to 7, sum of squares of digits equals 17
 2024 – tetrahedral number
 2025 = 452, sum of the cubes of the first nine integers, centered octagonal number
 2027 – super-prime, safe prime
 2029 – member of the Mian–Chowla sequence
 2030 = 212 + 222 + 232 + 242 = 252 + 262 + 272
 2031 – centered pentagonal number
 2039 – Sophie Germain prime, safe prime
 2045 – number of partially ordered set with 7 unlabeled elements
 2047 – super-Poulet number, Woodall number, decagonal number, a centered octahedral number. Also, 2047 = 211 - 1 = 23 × 89 and is the first Mersenne number that is composite for a prime exponent.
 2048 = 211
 2053 – star number
 2056 – magic constant of n × n normal magic square and n-queens problem for n = 16.
 2060 – sum of the totient function for the first 82 integers
 2063 – Sophie Germain prime,  safe prime. super-prime
 2069 – Sophie Germain prime
 2070 – pronic number
 2080 – triangular number
 2081 – super-prime
 2093 – Mertens function zero
 2095 – Mertens function zero
 2096 – Mertens function zero
 2097 – Mertens function zero
 2099 – Mertens function zero, super-prime, safe prime, highly cototient number

2100 to 2199
 2100 – Mertens function zero
 2101 – centered heptagonal number
 2107 – member of a Ruth–Aaron pair with 2108 (first definition)
 2108 – member of a Ruth–Aaron pair with 2107 (first definition)
 2109 – square pyramidal number, the sum of the third and last trio of three-digit permutable primes in decimal: 199 + 919 + 991. 
 2112 – The break-through album of the band Rush
 2113 – Mertens function zero, Proth prime, centered square number
 2116 = 462
 2117 – Mertens function zero
 2119 – Mertens function zero
 2120 – Mertens function zero, Fine number.
 2122 – Mertens function zero
 2125 – nonagonal number
 2127 – sum of the first 34 primes
 2129 – Sophie Germain prime
 2135 – Mertens function zero
 2136 – Mertens function zero
 2137 – prime of the form 2p-1
 2138 – Mertens function zero
 2141 – Sophie Germain prime
 2142 – sum of the totient function for the first 83 integers
 2143 – almost exactly 224
 2145 – triangular number
 2153 – with 2161, smallest consecutive primes that have the same sum of digits as each other's prime indices
 2161 – with 2153, smallest consecutive primes that have the same sum of digits as each other's prime indices
 2162 – pronic number
 2166 – sum of the totient function for the first 84 integers
 2169 – Leyland number
 2171 – Mertens function zero
 2172 – Mertens function zero
 2175 – smallest number requiring 143 seventh powers for Waring representation
 2176 – pentagonal pyramidal number, centered pentagonal number
 2178 – first natural number whose digits in its decimal representation get reversed when multiplied by 4.
 2179 – Wedderburn–Etherington prime
 2184 – equals both 37 − 3 and 133 − 13 and is believed to be the only such doubly strictly absurd number.
 2187 = 37, vampire number, perfect totient number
 2188 – Motzkin number
 2197 = 133, palindromic in base 12 (133112)
 2199 – perfect totient number

2200 to 2299
 2201 – only known non-palindromic number whose cube is palindromic; also no known fourth or higher powers are palindromic for non-palindromic numbers
 2203 – Mersenne prime exponent
 2205 – odd abundant number
 2207 – safe prime, Lucas prime
 2208 – Keith number
 2209 = 472, palindromic in base 14 (B3B14), centered octagonal number
 2211 – triangular number
 2221 – super-prime, happy number
 2222 – repdigit
 2223 – Kaprekar number
 2230 – sum of the totient function for the first 85 integers
 2232 – decagonal number
 2236 – Harshad number 
 2245 – centered square number
 2254 – member of the Mian–Chowla sequence
 2255 – octahedral number
 2256 – pronic number
 2269 – super-prime, cuban prime
 2272 – sum of the totient function for the first 86 integers
 2273 – Sophie Germain prime
 2276 – sum of the first 35 primes, centered heptagonal number
 2278 – triangular number
 2281 – star number, Mersenne prime exponent
 2287 – balanced prime
 2294 – Mertens function zero
 2295 – Mertens function zero
 2296 – Mertens function zero
 2299 – member of a Ruth–Aaron pair with 2300 (first definition)

2300 to 2399
 2300 – tetrahedral number, member of a Ruth–Aaron pair with 2299 (first definition)
 2301 – nonagonal number
 2304 = 482
 2306 – Mertens function zero
 2309 – primorial prime, twin prime with 2311, Mertens function zero, highly cototient number
 2310 – fifth primorial
 2311 – primorial prime, twin prime with 2309
 2321 – Mertens function zero
 2322 – Mertens function zero
 2326 – centered pentagonal number
 2328 – sum of the totient function for the first 87 integers, the number of groups of order 128
 2331 – centered cube number
 2338 – Mertens function zero
 2339 – Sophie Germain prime, twin prime with 2341
 2341 – super-prime, twin prime with 2339
 2346 – triangular number
 2347 – sum of seven consecutive primes (313 + 317 + 331 + 337 + 347 + 349 + 353)
 2351 – Sophie Germain prime, super-prime
 2352 – pronic number
 2357 – Smarandache–Wellin prime
 2368 – sum of the totient function for the first 88 integers
 2372 – logarithmic number
 2378 – Pell number
 2379 – member of the Mian–Chowla sequence
 2381 – super-prime, centered square number
 2383 (2384) – number of delegates required to win the 2016 Democratic Party presidential primaries (out of 4051)
 2393 – Sophie Germain prime
 2397 – sum of the squares of the first ten primes
 2399 – Sophie Germain prime

2400 to 2499
 2400 – perfect score on SAT tests administered after 2005
 2401 = 74, 492, centered octagonal number
 2415 – triangular number
 2417 – super-prime, balanced prime
 2425 – decagonal number
 2427 – sum of the first 36 primes
 2431 – product of three consecutive primes
 2437 – cuban prime, largest right-truncatable prime in base 5
 2447 – safe prime
 2450 – pronic number
 2456 – sum of the totient function for the first 89 integers
 2458 – centered heptagonal number
 2459 – Sophie Germain prime, safe prime
 2465 – magic constant of n × n normal magic square and n-queens problem for n = 17, Carmichael number
 2470 – square pyramidal number
 2471 – number of ways to partition {1,2,3,4,5,6} and then partition each cell (block) into subcells.
 2477 – super-prime, cousin prime
 2480 – sum of the totient function for the first 90 integers
 2481 – centered pentagonal number
 2484 – nonagonal number
 2485 – triangular number, number of planar partitions of 13
 2491 = 47 * 53, consecutive prime numbers, member of Ruth–Aaron pair with 2492 under second definition
 2492 – member of Ruth–Aaron pair with 2491 under second definition

2500 to 2599
 2500 = 502, palindromic in base 7 (102017)
 2501 – Mertens function zero
 2502 – Mertens function zero
 2503 – Friedman prime
 2510 – member of the Mian–Chowla sequence
 2513 – member of the Padovan sequence
 2517 – Mertens function zero
 2519 – the smallest number congruent to 1 (mod 2), 2 (mod 3), 3 (mod 4), ..., 9 (mod 10)
 2520 – superior highly composite number; smallest number divisible by numbers 1, 2, 3, 4, 5, 6, 7, 8, 9, 10, and 12 ; colossally abundant number; Harshad number in several bases. It is also the highest number with more divisors than any number less than double itself . Not only it is the 7th (and last) number with more divisors than any number double itself but is also the 7th number that is highly composite and the lowest common multiple of a consecutive set of integers from 1  which is a property the previous number with this pattern of divisors does not have (360). That is, although 360 and 2520 both have more divisors than any number twice themselves, 2520 is the lowest number divisible by both 1 to 9 and 1 to 10, whereas 360 is not the lowest number divisible by 1 to 6 (which 60 is) and is not divisible by 1 to 7 (which 420 is). It is also the 6th and largest highly composite number that is a divisor of every higher highly composite number.
 2521 – star prime, centered square number
 2522 – Mertens function zero
 2523 – Mertens function zero
 2524 – Mertens function zero
 2525 – Mertens function zero
 2530 – Mertens function zero, Leyland number
 2533 – Mertens function zero
 2537 – Mertens function zero
 2538 – Mertens function zero
 2543 – Sophie Germain prime, sexy prime with 2549
 2549 – Sophie Germain prime, super-prime, sexy prime with 2543
 2550 – pronic number
 2552 – sum of the totient function for the first 91 integers
 2556 – triangular number
 2567 – Mertens function zero
 2568 – Mertens function zero. Also number of digits in the decimal expansion of 1000!, or the product of all natural numbers from 1 to 1000.
 2570 – Mertens function zero
 2579 – safe prime
 2580 – Keith number, forms a column on a telephone or PIN pad
 2584 – Fibonacci number, sum of the first 37 primes
 2592 – 3-smooth number (25×34)
 2596 – sum of the totient function for the first 92 integers

2600 to 2699
 2600 – tetrahedral number, member of a Ruth–Aaron pair with 2601 (first definition)
 2600 Hz is the tone used by a blue box to defeat toll charges on long distance telephone calls.
 2600: The Hacker Quarterly is a magazine named after the above.
 The Atari 2600 was a popular video game console.
 2601 = 512, member of a Ruth–Aaron pair with 2600 (first definition)
 2609 – super-prime
 2620 – telephone number, amicable number with 2924
 2625 = a centered octahedral number
 2626 – decagonal number
 2628 – triangular number
 2632 – number of consecutive baseball games played by Cal Ripken Jr.
 2633 – sum of twenty-five consecutive primes (47 + 53 + 59 + 61 + 67 + 71 + 73 + 79 + 83 + 89 + 97 + 101 + 103 + 107 + 109 + 113 + 127 + 131 + 137 + 139 + 149 + 151 + 157 + 163 + 167)
 2641 – centered pentagonal number
 2647 – super-prime, centered heptagonal number
 2652 – pronic number
 2656 – sum of the totient function for the first 93 integers
 2665 – centered square number
 2674 – nonagonal number
 2677 – balanced prime
 2680 – number of 11-queens problem solutions
 2683 – super-prime
 2689 – Mertens function zero, Proth prime
 2693 – Sophie Germain prime
 2699 – Sophie Germain prime

2700 to 2799
 2701 – triangular number, super-Poulet number
 2702 – sum of the totient function for the first 94 integers
 2704 = 522
 2707 – model number for the concept supersonic airliner Boeing 2707
  – super-prime, largest known odd number which cannot be expressed in the form x2 + y2 + 10z2 where x, y and z are integers. In 1997 it was conjectured that this is also the largest such odd number. It is now known this is true if the generalized Riemann hypothesis is true.
 2728 – Kaprekar number
 2729 – highly cototient number
 2731 – the only Wagstaff prime with four digits, Jacobsthal prime
 2736 – octahedral number
 2741 – Sophie Germain prime, 400th prime number
 2744 = 143, palindromic in base 13 (133113)
 2747 – sum of the first 38 primes
 2749 – super-prime, cousin prime with 2753
 2753 – Sophie Germain prime, Proth prime
 2756 – pronic number
 2774 – sum of the totient function for the first 95 integers
 2775 – triangular number
 2780 – member of the Mian–Chowla sequence
 2783 – member of a Ruth–Aaron pair with 2784 (first definition)
 2784 – member of a Ruth–Aaron pair with 2783 (first definition)
 2791 – cuban prime

2800 to 2899
 2801 – first base 7 repunit prime
 2803 – super-prime
 2806 – centered pentagonal number, sum of the totient function for the first 96 integers
 2809 = 532, centered octagonal number
 2813 – centered square number
 2816 – number of parts in all compositions of 10.
 2819 – Sophie Germain prime, safe prime, sum of seven consecutive primes (383 + 389 + 397 + 401 + 409 + 419 + 421)
 2821 – Carmichael number
 2835 – odd abundant number, decagonal number
 2843 – centered heptagonal prime
 2850 – triangular number
 2862 – pronic number
 2870 – square pyramidal number
 2871 – nonagonal number
 2872 – tetranacci number
 2879 – safe prime
 2897 – super-prime, Markov prime

2900 to 2999
 2902 – sum of the totient function for the first 97 integers
 2903 – Sophie Germain prime, safe prime, balanced prime
 2909 – super-prime
 2914 – sum of the first 39 primes
 2915 – Lucas–Carmichael number
 2916 = 542
 2924 – amicable number with 2620
 2925 – magic constant of n × n normal magic square and n-queens problem for n = 18, tetrahedral number, member of the Mian-Chowla sequence
 2926 – triangular number
 2939 – Sophie Germain prime
 2944 – sum of the totient function for the first 98 integers
 2963 – Sophie Germain prime, safe prime, balanced prime
 2964 – number of parallelogram polyominoes with 11 cells
 2965 – greater of second pair of Smith brothers, centered square number
 2969 – Sophie Germain prime
 2970 – harmonic divisor number, pronic number
 2976 – centered pentagonal number
 2989 – in hexadecimal, reads as "BAD"
 2997 – 1000-gonal number
 2999 – safe prime

Prime numbers
There are 127 prime numbers between 2000 and 3000:
2003, 2011, 2017, 2027, 2029, 2039, 2053, 2063, 2069, 2081, 2083, 2087, 2089, 2099, 2111, 2113, 2129, 2131, 2137, 2141, 2143, 2153, 2161, 2179, 2203, 2207, 2213, 2221, 2237, 2239, 2243, 2251, 2267, 2269, 2273, 2281, 2287, 2293, 2297, 2309, 2311, 2333, 2339, 2341, 2347, 2351, 2357, 2371, 2377, 2381, 2383, 2389, 2393, 2399, 2411, 2417, 2423, 2437, 2441, 2447, 2459, 2467, 2473, 2477, 2503, 2521, 2531, 2539, 2543, 2549, 2551, 2557, 2579, 2591, 2593, 2609, 2617, 2621, 2633, 2647, 2657, 2659, 2663, 2671, 2677, 2683, 2687, 2689, 2693, 2699, 2707, 2711, 2713, 2719, 2729, 2731, 2741, 2749, 2753, 2767, 2777, 2789, 2791, 2797, 2801, 2803, 2819, 2833, 2837, 2843, 2851, 2857, 2861, 2879, 2887, 2897, 2903, 2909, 2917, 2927, 2939, 2953, 2957, 2963, 2969, 2971, 2999

References 

Integers